Bruce French may refer to:

Bruce French (actor) (born 1945), American actor
Bruce French (cricketer) (born 1959), former English cricketer
Bruce French (agricultural scientist), Australian scientist
J. Bruce French (1921–2002), Canadian-American nuclear physicist